Sphincterochilidae is a taxonomic family of medium-sized air-breathing land snails, terrestrial pulmonate gastropod mollusks in the superfamily Helicoidea (according to the taxonomy of the Gastropoda by Bouchet & Rocroi, 2005).

In the fossil record, Sphincterochilidae are known from the upper Eocene to the Holocene.

Distribution 
The distribution of Sphincterochilidae includes the western-Palearctic zone.

Taxonomy 
The following two subfamilies have been recognized in the taxonomy of Bouchet & Rocroi (2005):
 subfamily Sphincterochilinae Zilch, 1960 (1910) - synonyms: Calcarinidae Pallary, 1909 (inv.); Albeidae Pallary, 1910. Sphincterochilidae is a conserved name to take the priority of Leucochroidae Westerlund, 1886.
 subfamily † Pseudoleptaxinae H. Nordsieck, 1986

Genera 
Genera within the family Sphincterochilidae include:

Sphincterochilinae
 † Asensidea Calzada, 2003 
 Sphincterochila Ancey, 1887 - type genus of the family Sphincterochilidae

† Pseudoleptaxinae
 † Dentellocaracolus Oppenheim, 1890 
 † Fridolinia Pilsbry, 1895 †
 † Pseudoleptaxis Pilsbry, 1895 - type genus o the subfamily Pseudoleptaxinae

 † Wenzia Pfeffer, 1930

Ecology 
Sphincterochilidae land snails are xerothermophilous, i.e. they are well adapted to hot, arid places.

References

 Bank, R. A. (2017). Classification of the Recent terrestrial Gastropoda of the World. Last update: July 16th, 2017.

External links